Classy Country is a studio album by American recording artist Wanda Jackson. It was released in 1988 via Amethyst Records and contained 11 tracks. The album was a mixture of re-recorded tracks, along with several new songs cut exclusively for the album.

Background, content and release
Wanda Jackson was considered among the first women to have success in both the country and Rockabilly music genres. Her singles included "Fujiyama Mama", "Let's Have a Party", "In the Middle of a Heartache" and "The Box It Came In". After pursuing gospel music, Jackson's recorded less secular material. However, in the 1980s, Jackson was given opportunities to record country music for several smaller labels, which included Amethyst Records. Classy Country was recorded in 1988 at Studio Seven, a recording venue located in Oklahoma City, Oklahoma. The sessions were recorded under producer Gregg W. Gray.

Classy Country contained a total of 11 tracks of country music material. Nearly half of these tracks were re-recordings of songs Jackson cut earlier in her career. This included a re-recording of "In the Middle of a Heartache", along with the songs "Right or Wrong", "Silver Threads and Golden Needles" and "Grandma Sang Off Key". Several new selections were also included on the project, such as "What Does Love Really Feel Like" and "No Hard Feelings". Classy Country was released on the Amethyst label in 1988 as a cassette. It was Jackson's first album with the Amethyst record company, with a second to follow in 1989.

Track listing

Personnel
All credits are adapted from the liner notes of Classy Country.

Musical and technical personnel
 Ronnie Goss – Background vocals
 Gregg W. Gray – Keyboards, producer
 Wanda Jackson – Lead vocals
 Melodee Johnson – Background vocals
 Renier Knetsch – Steel guitar
 Woody Lingle – Bass
 Carolyn McCoy – Background vocals
 Ric Wright – Guitar

Release history

References

1988 albums
Wanda Jackson albums